Lucille Lee Stewart (December 25, 1889 – January 8, 1982) was an American film actress of the silent era. Her screen career lasted between 1910 and 1926, during which time she played a mixture of lead and supporting roles.

Stewart worked in vaudeville before she began acting in films. Her early film work was in comedies for Vitagraph. Most of her roles were second leads, and her success dwindled in the 1920s. She "lived the remainder of her life in obscurity" after her 1925 divorce.

She was the elder sister of actress Anita Stewart. She was married to the actor and director Ralph Ince from 1910 to 1925 when they divorced.

Stewart's "debut as a leading player" in a film came in The Destroyers (1916).

Partial filmography

 Love in Quarantine (1910)
 The Conflict (1916)
 Our Mrs. McChesney (1918)
 The Eleventh Commandment (1918)
 Five Thousand an Hour (1918)
 Sealed Hearts (1919)
 The Perfect Lover (1919)
 A Woman's Business (1920)
 The Woman Gives (1920)
 The Fool (1925)
 Friendly Enemies (1925)
 Bad Company (1925)
 Fifth Avenue (1926)
 Sunshine of Paradise Alley (1926)

References

Bibliography
 Billy H. Doyle. The Ultimate Directory of the Silent Screen Performers. Scarecrow Press, 1995.

External links

1889 births
1982 deaths
American silent film actresses
20th-century American actresses
American film actresses
People from Brooklyn